Campton is a home rule-class city in and the county seat of Wolfe County, Kentucky, United States. The population was 441 at the 2010 census.

History
Campton was a camp town with a small creek, Swift Creek (named after Jonathan Swift of the legend of Swift's silver mine),  running through the town.  Swift supposedly buried treasure in the area which has never been recovered.

Geography

Demographics

As of the census of 2000, there were 424 people, 196 households, and 117 families residing in the city. The racial makeup of the city was 99.76% White, and 0.24% from two or more races. Hispanic or Latino of any race were 0.71% of the population.

There were 196 households, out of which 28.6% had children under the age of 18 living with them, 41.8% were married couples living together, 16.3% had a female householder with no husband present, and 40.3% were non-families. 37.2% of all households were made up of individuals, and 14.3% had someone living alone who was 65 years of age or older. The average household size was 2.16 and the average family size was 2.85.

In the city, the population was spread out, with 22.4% under the age of 18, 10.4% from 18 to 24, 28.1% from 25 to 44, 23.8% from 45 to 64, and 15.3% who were 65 years of age or older. The median age was 38 years. For every 100 females, there were 88.4 males. For every 100 females age 18 and over, there were 84.8 males.

The median income for a household in the city was $17,778, and the median income for a family was $21,528. Males had a median income of $24,375 versus $21,875 for females. The per capita income for the city was $11,167. About 31.8% of families and 34.6% of the population were below the poverty line, including 47.4% of those under age 18 and 23.6% of those age 65 or over.

Education
Campton has a lending library, the Wolfe County Public Library.

Arts and culture
The annual Swift Silver Mine Festival is held on Labor Day weekend each year. It includes a parade and vendors in the downtown area.

Notable people
Folk artist Edgar Tolson; Ralph Rinzler of the Smithsonian Institution was impressed by Tolson's figures, and included them in the 1971 Festival of American Folklife.
Folk artist Randy Spencer; Well known folk artist and creator of Kentucky Walking Sticks.
Tyler Booth, Country singer, grew up near the city Campton, Kentucky, population 424, on a farm where he begin playing guitar and writing songs from an early age. Booth signed a major record deal with Sony Music Nashville in early 2020. His voice and song writing talents were discovered while attending college at Morehead State University his freshman year.

References

 

Cities in Wolfe County, Kentucky
Cities in Kentucky
County seats in Kentucky
Populated places established in 1870
1870 establishments in Kentucky